So Natural, an Australian brand of organic products, is part of Freedom Foods Group, a diversified food company operating in the health and wellness sector. So Natural was formed in 1991 when it started producing soy milk.

In 2004, So Natural gained wide publicity in Australia when it announced an equity deal with Australian swimmer Ian Thorpe. Thorpe was offered a stake in Freedom Foods Group, initially worth A$1.1m in return for the use of his name and image on their products. The 15-year deal covers markets across East and Southeast Asia where Thorpe is widely popular, and could expand Thorpe's share in the venture to 50 percent depending on its commercial success.

Freedom Foods Group is listed on the Australian Securities Exchange. The Perich family of Leppington, who appear annually on the Financial Review Rich List, have a substantive holding in the company.

References

External links
Freedom Foods consumer website
So Natural brand website

Food and drink companies of Australia